The two-state solution to the Israeli–Palestinian conflict envisions an independent State of Palestine alongside the State of Israel, west of the Jordan River. The boundary between the two states is still subject to dispute and negotiation, with Palestinian and Arab leadership insisting on the "1967 borders", which is not accepted by Israel. The territory of the former Mandate Palestine (including West Jerusalem) which did not form part of the Palestinian State would continue to be part of Israel.

In 1947, the United Nations General Assembly adopted United Nations Partition Plan for Palestine, which was rejected by Arab leaders. In 1974, a UN resolution on the "Peaceful settlement of the question of Palestine" called  for "two States, Israel and Palestine … side by side within secure and recognized borders" together with "a just resolution of the refugee question in conformity with UN resolution 194". The borders of the state of Palestine would be "based on the pre-1967 borders". The latest resolution, in November 2013, was passed 165 to 6, with 6 abstentions; with Israel and the United States voting against.

The Palestinian leadership has embraced the concept since the 1982 Arab Summit in Fez. Israel views moves by Palestinian leaders to obtain international recognition of a State of Palestine as being unilateral action by the Palestinians and inconsistent with a negotiated two-state solution.

It was reported in 2009 that although polls had consistently shown Israeli and Palestinian majorities in favor of a negotiated two-state settlement, there was "growing disillusionment" with a two-state solution. In 2014, 60% of Palestinians said the final goal of their national movement should be "to work toward reclaiming all of historic Palestine from the river to the sea". A poll published in 2021 by the Palestinian Center for Policy and Survey Research revealed that only 39% of Palestinians support the two-state solution. Another report published in 2021 by the RAND Corporation found that Israelis across the political spectrum opposed a two-state solution.

There have been many diplomatic efforts to realize a two-state solution, starting from the 1991 Madrid Conference. There followed the 1993 Oslo Accords and the failed 2000 Camp David Summit followed by the Taba negotiations in early 2001. In 2002, the Arab League proposed the Arab Peace Initiative. The latest initiative, which also failed, was the 2013–14 peace talks. A 2021 survey of experts found that 52 percent believe that the two-state solution is no longer achievable. 77 percent believe that if not achieved, the result would be a "one-state reality akin to apartheid". According to a 2021 PCPSR poll, support for a two-state solution among Palestinians and Israeli Jews, as of 2021, has declined to 43 percent and 42 percent, respectively. According to Middle East experts David Pollock and Catherine Cleveland, as of 2021, the majority of Palestinians say they want to reclaim all of historic Palestine, including pre-1967 Israel. A one-state solution with equal rights for Arabs and Jews is ranked second.

History of the two-state solution 
The first proposal for the creation of Jewish and Arab states in the British Mandate of Palestine was made in the Peel Commission report of 1937, with the Mandate continuing to cover only a small area containing Jerusalem. The recommended partition proposal was rejected by the Arab community of Palestine, and was accepted by most of the Jewish leadership.

Partition was again proposed by the 1947 UN Partition plan for the division of Palestine. It proposed a three-way division, again with Jerusalem held separately, under international control. The partition plan was accepted by the Jewish leadership. However, the plan was rejected by the leadership of Arab nations and the Palestinian leadership, which opposed any partition of Palestine and any independent Jewish presence in the area. The 1948 Arab–Israeli War for control of the disputed land broke out on the end of the British Mandate, which came to an end with the 1949 Armistice Agreements. The war resulted in the fleeing or expulsion of 711,000 Palestinians, which the Palestinians call Nakba, from the territories which became the state of Israel. Rather than establishing a Palestinian state on land that Israel did not control, the Arab nations chose instead to support the United Nations Relief and Works Agency for Palestine Refugees in the Near East and the Palestinian refugees remained stateless.

UN resolution 242 and the recognition of Palestinian rights 
After the 1967 Arab–Israeli war, the United Nations Security Council unanimously passed resolution 242 calling for Israeli withdrawal from the territories occupied during the war, in exchange for "termination of all claims or states of belligerency" and "acknowledgement of sovereignty, territorial integrity and political independence of every state in the area". The Palestine Liberation Organization (PLO), which had been formed in 1964, strongly criticized the resolution, saying that it reduced the question of Palestine to a refugee problem.

In September 1974, 56 Member States proposed that "the question of Palestine" be included as an item in the General Assembly's agenda. In a resolution adopted on 22 November 1974, the General Assembly affirmed Palestinian rights, which included the "right to self-determination without external interference", "the right to national independence and sovereignty", and the "right to return to their homes and property". These rights have been affirmed every year since.

PLO acceptance of a two-state solution 
The first indication that the PLO would be willing to accept a two-state solution, on at least an interim basis, was articulated by Said Hammami in the mid-1970s.

Security Council resolutions dating back to June 1976 supporting the two-state solution based on the pre-1967 lines were vetoed by the United States, which supports a two-state solution but argued that the borders must be negotiated directly by the parties. The idea has had overwhelming support in the UN General Assembly since the mid-1970s.

The Palestinian Declaration of Independence of 15 November 1988, which referenced the UN Partition Plan of 1947 and "UN resolutions since 1947" in general, was interpreted as an indirect recognition of the State of Israel, and support for a two-state solution. The Partition Plan was invoked to provide legitimacy to Palestinian statehood. Subsequent clarifications were taken to amount to the first explicit Palestinian recognition of Israel.

Diplomatic efforts 

In 1975, the General Assembly established the Committee on the Exercise of the Inalienable Rights of the Palestinian People. In 1976, the Committee presented two sets of recommendations, one concerned with the Palestinians' right of return to their homes and property, and the other with their rights to self-determination, national independence and sovereignty. The Security Council discussed the recommendations but failed to reach a decision due to the negative vote of the United States.

After the First Intifada began in 1987, considerable diplomatic work went into negotiating a two-state solution between the parties, beginning with the Madrid Conference in 1991. The most significant of these negotiations was the Oslo Accords, which officially divided Palestinian land into three administrative divisions and created the framework for how much of Israel's political borders with the Palestinian territories function today. The Accords culminated in the Camp David 2000 Summit, and follow-up negotiations at Taba in January 2001, but no final agreement was ever reached. The violent outbreak of the Second Intifada in 2000 had demonstrated the Palestinian public's disillusionment with the Oslo Accords and convinced many Israelis that the negotiations were in vain.

Possible two-state solutions have been discussed by Saudi and US leaders. In 2002, Crown Prince Abdullah of Saudi Arabia (who would go on to be King from 2005 to 2015) proposed the Arab Peace Initiative, which garnered the unanimous support of the Arab League while Israeli leaders continually refuse to discuss the initiative. President Bush announced his support for a Palestinian state, opening the way for United Nations Security Council Resolution 1397, supporting a two-state solution.

At the Annapolis Conference in November 2007, three major parties—The PLO, Israel, and the US—agreed on a two-state solution as the outline for negotiations. However, the summit failed to achieve an agreement.

Following the conflict that erupted between the two main Palestinian parties, Fatah and Hamas, Hamas took control of the Gaza Strip, splintering the Palestinian Authority into two polities, each claiming to be the true representatives of the Palestinian people. Fatah controlled the Palestinian National Authority in the West Bank and Hamas Governed in Gaza.

The latest initiatives were the 2013–14 Israeli–Palestinian peace talks under the guidance of John Kerry, the United States Secretary of State. These talks also failed to reach an agreement.

Viability 
By 2010, when direct talks were scheduled to be restarted, continued growth of settlements on the West Bank and continued strong support of settlements by the Israeli government had greatly reduced the land and resources that would be available to a Palestinian state creating doubt among Palestinians and left-wing Israelis that a two-state solution continued to be viable. In January 2012 the European Union Heads of Mission report on East Jerusalem found that Israel's continuing settlement activities and the fragile situation of the Palestinian population in East Jerusalem, as well in area C, was making a two-state solution less likely. The Israeli Foreign Ministry rejected this EU report, claiming it was "based on a partial, biased and one sided depiction of realities on the ground." In May 2012, the EU council stressed its "deep concern about developments on the ground which threaten to make a two-state solution impossible'.

On 29 November 2012, the UN General Assembly voted by 138 to 9, with 46 abstentions to recognize Palestine as a "non-member observer state". On the following day, Israeli PM Benjamin Netanyahu announced the building of 3,000 new homes on land to the east of East Jerusalem, in an area referred to as "E-1". The move was immediately criticized by several countries, including the United States, with Israeli ambassadors being personally called for meetings with government representatives in the UK, France and Germany, among others. Israel's decision to build the homes was described by the Obama administration as "counterproductive", while Australia said that the building plans "threaten the viability of a two-state solution". This is because they claim the proposed E-1 settlement would physically split the lands under the control of the Palestinian National Authority in two, as the extent of the PNA's authority does not extend all the way to the River Jordan and the Dead Sea. Israel's Labor party has voiced support for the two-state solution, with Isaac Herzog stating it would be "in Israel's interests".

in March 2015, Netanyahu declared that a Palestinian state would not be established during his administration, while he also stated that he disapproved the one-state solution for the ongoing conflict between two people.

After controversial Jerusalem recognition by Trump administration in favor of Israel in December 2017, Palestinian officials said the policy change "destroys the peace process" and the decision indirectly meant the United States was "abdicating its role as a peace mediator" that could no longer act as a mediator in the peace process because the United States had become a party to the dispute instead of neutral intercessor for negotiations.

A 2021 survey of experts found that 52 percent of respondents believed the two-state solution is no longer possible. If a two-state solution is not achieved, 77 percent predict "a one-state reality akin to apartheid" and 17 percent "one-state reality with increasing inequality, but not akin to apartheid"; just 1 percent think a binational state with equal rights for all inhabitants is likely.

Settlements in the West Bank 
The UN resolutions affirm the illegality of settlements in West Bank, including East Jerusalem. Proposals have been offered for over 50  post-evacuation compensation of settlers for abandoned property, as occurred following Israel's withdrawal of settlements from Gaza in 2005 and from the Sinai Peninsula in 1982. Some settlers in those previous withdrawals were forcibly removed by the IDF.

In December 2016, United Nations Security Council Resolution 2334 was formally passed as the condemnation against Israeli settlement in West Bank.

Public opinion in Israel and Palestine 

Many Palestinians and Israelis, as well as the Arab League, have stated that they would accept a two-state solution based on 1949 Armistice Agreements, more commonly referred to as the "1967 borders". In a 2002 poll conducted by PIPA, 72% of both Palestinians and Israelis supported at that time a peace settlement based on the 1967 borders so long as each group could be reassured that the other side would be cooperative in making the necessary concessions for such a settlement. A 2013 Gallup poll found 70% of Palestinians in the West Bank and 48% of Palestinians in Gaza Strip, together with 52% of Israelis supporting "an independent Palestinian state together with the state of Israel".

Support for a two-state solution varies according to the way the question is phrased. Some Israeli journalists suggest that the Palestinians are unprepared to accept a Jewish State on any terms. According to one poll, "fewer than 2 in 10 Arabs, both Palestinian and all others, believe in Israel's right to exist as a nation with a Jewish majority." Another poll, however, cited by the US State Department, suggests that "78 percent of Palestinians and 74 percent of Israelis believe a peace agreement that leads to both states living side by side as good neighbors" is "essential or desirable".

As of 2021, most Palestinians are against the two-state solution. In 2021, a poll by the Palestinian Center for Policy and Survey Research revealed that 39% of Palestinians accept a two-state solution, while 59% said they rejected it. Support is even lower among younger Palestinians; U.S. Secretary of State Condoleezza Rice noted: "Increasingly, the Palestinians who talk about a two-state solution are my age." A survey taken before the outbreak of fighting in 2014 by the Washington Institute for Near East Policy (WINEP) found that 60 percent of Palestinians say the goal of their national movement should be "to work toward reclaiming all of historic Palestine from the river to the sea" compared to just 27 percent who endorse the idea that they should work "to end the occupation of the West Bank and Gaza and achieve a two-state solution." WINEP says that "this is a new finding compared to similar (but not identical) questions asked in the past, when support for a two-state solution typically ranged between 40–55 percent". By 2020, 40% in Gaza and 26% in the West Bank believe that a negotiated two-state solution should solve the conflict.

The two-state solution enjoys majority support in Israeli polls although there has been some erosion to its prospects over time. A 2014 Haaretz poll asking "Consider that in the framework of an agreement, most settlers are annexed to Israel, Jerusalem will be divided, refugees won't return to Israel and there will be a strict security arrangement, would you support this agreement?", only 35% of Israelis said yes.

Other solutions 

Another option is the binational solution, which could either be a twin regime federalist arrangement or a unitary state, and the Allon Plan, also known as the "no-state solution".

Three-state solution 
The three-state solution has been proposed as another alternative. The New York Times reported that Egypt and Jordan were concerned about having to retake responsibility for Gaza and the West Bank. In effect, the result would be Gaza returning to Egyptian rule, and the West Bank to Jordan.

Proposal of dual citizenship 
A number of proposals for the granting of Palestinian citizenship or residential permits to Jewish settlers in return for the removal of Israeli military installations from the West Bank have been fielded by such individuals as Arafat, Ibrahim Sarsur and Ahmed Qurei.

Israeli Minister Moshe Ya'alon said in April 2010 that "just as Arabs live in Israel, so, too, should Jews be able to live in Palestine." ... "If we are talking about coexistence and peace, why the [Palestinian] insistence that the territory they receive be ethnically cleansed of Jews?"

The idea has been expressed by both advocates of the two-state solution and supporters of the settlers and conservative or fundamentalist currents in Israeli Judaism that, while objecting to any withdrawal, claim stronger links to the land than to the state of Israel.

See also 
 List of Middle East peace proposals
 One-state solution
 Palestinianism
 State of Judea
 United Nations Partition Plan for Palestine
 Zionism

References

Further reading 
 Aharon Cohen, Israel and the Arab World (Funk and Wagnalls, New York, 1970).

External links 
 The Future of the TwoState Solution, Giora Eiland, Jerusalem Center for Public Affairs, February 2009
 Two-state solution-discredited – without workable alternative, Beate Zilversmidt, The Other Israel, May 2006
 "Two-State Chimera, No-State Solution". Why there won't ever be two 'states'. Cameron Hunt, Counter Currents, May 2007
 "Banging Square Pegs into Round Holes," Dore Gold, ed. David Pollack, Washington Institute for Near East Policy, December 2008
 "The Middle East conflict and the two-state solution," RearVision, ABC Radio National, September 23, 2009
 Taking the two-state solution seriously, Opinion by Alain Dieckhoff, March 2009, European Union Institute for Security Studies
 A Demilitarized Palestinian State, On the meaning of that & summary of security arrangement out of previous Israeli-Palestinian accords, Reut Institution (a Think Tank)

 
Israeli–Palestinian peace process